opened in Kōchi, Kōchi Prefecture, Japan, in 2017. Located beside the main gate of Kōchi Castle, the collection tells the history of the Tosa Domain and of the Prefecture, and comprises the 67,000 items formerly preserved, researched, and exhibited at the Tosa Yamauchi Family Treasury and Archives.

See also
 Kōchi Prefectural Museum of History
 List of Historic Sites of Japan (Kōchi)
 Tosa Domain
 List of Cultural Properties of Japan - paintings (Kōchi)
 List of Cultural Properties of Japan - historical materials (Kōchi)

References

External links

 Kōchi Castle Museum of History

Museums in Kōchi Prefecture
Museums established in 2017
2017 establishments in Japan
Kōchi